This is a list of notable people whose full legal name is (or was) a mononym, either by name change or by being born mononymic (e.g. Burmese, Indonesian, or Japanese royalty). Titles (e.g. Burmese honorifics) do not count against inclusion, because they are not part of the name itself.

This list does not include people who are mononymous only as a stage name, pen name/pseudonym, in certain contexts, or by dint of fame.

List

See also
 List of one-word stage names
 Mononymous person

References

Monomymous